Cello Sonata No. 2 may refer to:

 Cello Sonatas Nos. 1 and 2 (Beethoven), by Ludwig van Beethoven
 Cello Sonata No. 2 (Brahms), by Johannes Brahms
 Cello Sonata No. 2 (Mendelssohn), by Felix Mendelssohn
 Cello Sonata No. 2 (Ries), by Ferdinand Ries
 Cello Sonata No. 2 (Fauré), by Gabriel Fauré
 Cello Sonata No. 2 (Enescu), by George Enescu
 Cello Sonata No. 2 (Oswald), by Henrique Oswald